Hyper 3-D Pinball is a video game developed by British studio NMS Software and published by Virgin Interactive Entertainment for DOS, PlayStation, and Sega Saturn.

Gameplay
Hyper 3-D Pinball is a pinball game with several photorealistic tables.

Reception

Next Generation reviewed the PC version of the game, rating it four stars out of five, and stated that "The only real elements that keep this title from being nirvana are those that are missing: control of tilt sensitivity, number of balls, and table angles."

Reviews
PC Gamer Vol. 3 No. 4 (1996 April)
Computer Gaming World (May, 1996)
GamePro (Jan, 1997)
PC Games - Feb, 1996
PC Player (Germany) - Jan, 1996
GameSpot - Dec 01, 1996
SuperGamePower (Sep, 1997)
Superjuegos (Jul, 1996) (Spanish)
Joystick (French) (Dec, 1995)
Coming Soon Magazine (Jan 13, 1996)
Consolemania (Mar, 1997) (Italian)
PC Joker (Dec, 1995) (German)
Absolute Playstation (Mar, 1997)

References

1996 video games
DOS games
NMS Software games
Pinball video games
PlayStation (console) games
Sega Saturn games
Video games developed in the United Kingdom
Virgin Interactive games